Babayaran Mo ng Dugo is a 1989 Philippine action film directed by Francis "Jun" Posadas. The film stars Jestoni Alarcon, Rita Avila, John Regala, Robert Arevalo, Michael de Mesa, Subas Herrero, Dick Israel, Maita Soriano, Jovit Moya, and Rachel Lobangco. The film is based on the novel of the same title by Ofelia Concepcion.

Cast
Jestoni Alarcon as Sid Alonzo
Rita Avila as Amelia
John Regala as Eric
Robert Arevalo as Rafael Alonzo
Michael de Mesa as Nelson
Subas Herrero as Don Enrique
Dick Israel as Lito
Maita Soriano
Jovit Moya as Nelson's Friend
Rachel Lobangco as Olga
Baby O’Brien as Sid's mother
Precious Hipolito as Sid's sister
Dan Fernandez as Nelson's Friend
Fred Moro as Nelson's Friend
Rusty Santos
Usman Hassim
Turko
Ernie David
Cris Daluz
Naty Santiago
Ernie Zarate
Big Boy Gomez

References

External links

1989 films
1989 action films
Filipino-language films
Philippine action films
Seiko Films films
Films directed by Francis Posadas